Dazzey Duks is the debut album by Duice, released on May 11, 1993, through TMR/Bellmark Records. Its single was "Dazzey Duks", which peaked at No. 19 on the Hot Rap Singles and No. 12 on the Billboard Hot 100. The album peaked at No. 84 on the Billboard 200.

Track listing
"Dazzey Duks"- 4:04
"Feel What I Feel" - 4:06
"The Pawee" - 3:25
"Bring the Bass" - 4:32
"Duice Is in the House" - 4:28
"Booty Call" - 3:59
"Dazzey Duks (Remix - Ruffhouse Version)" - 5:14
"Shitty-Shitty" - 2:33
"Pass the Mic" - 4:36

References

1993 debut albums
Miami bass albums